Feni may refer to:

Places
Feni District, a district of Chittagong Division, Bangladesh 
Feni, Bangladesh, the capital city of Feni District
Feni Sadar Upazila, an Upazila of Feni District
Feni Islands, an island group in Papua New Guinea
Feni River, a river in Bangladesh and India

People
Dumile Feni (1942–1991), South African artist
Feni Rose (born 1973), Indonesian TV presenter and entrepreneur
Gagame Feni (born 1992), Solomon Islands footballer

Other
Feni (liquor), a spirit produced in Goa, India
KK Feni Industries, a professional basketball club based in Kavadarci, Republic of Macedonia
Iron–nickel alloy, sometimes abbreviated FeNi

See also
Fenis (disambiguation)
Sutarfeni, an Indian sweet